The United Kingdom of Great Britain and Northern Ireland competed under the shortened name Great Britain and Northern Ireland, at the 2006 European Athletics Championships held in Sweden.

Results 

List of Britain's results, where athletes reached the final in that event (performances in heats, quarter-finals and semi-finals are not included.)

Competitors

References

Great Britain
2006
European Athletics Championships
2006 in Northern Ireland sport